The Boker Rocks are a rocky exposure located  northeast of Von der Wall Point on the south coast of Thurston Island. The feature was mapped by the United States Geological Survey from surveys and from U.S. Navy air photos, 1960–66, and named by the Advisory Committee on Antarctic Names for Helmut C. Boker, a meteorologist at Byrd Station, 1964–65.

Maps
 Thurston Island – Jones Mountains. 1:500000 Antarctica Sketch Map. US Geological Survey, 1967.
 Antarctic Digital Database (ADD). Scale 1:250000 topographic map of Antarctica. Scientific Committee on Antarctic Research (SCAR). Since 1993, regularly upgraded and updated.

References 

Rock formations of Ellsworth Land